Matic Sirnik (born January 28, 1991 in Ljubljana, SR Slovenia, SFR Yugoslavia) is a Slovenian basketball player, 2.00 m tall.

Career

Union Olimpija 
Sirnik began his career playing with the KK Janče and Union Olimpija as a junior.

Sirnik debuted in the UPC Telemach League in the 2007-08 season with Union Olimpija. He won the Slovenian championship and Cup with Union Olimpija that year.

He made his Euroleague debut on January 8, 2009, against Fenerbahce Ulker. First game in Euroleague he scored no points, 2 rebounds with only 17 years. 
He didn't play in Adriatic League, but he mad some appearances in UPC Telemach League.

References

External links
Profile at KZS 

1991 births
Living people
Slovenian men's basketball players
KK Olimpija players
Basketball players from Ljubljana
Shooting guards